Alirio is a given name of uncertain origin, perhaps from a popular form of Latin Hilarius. Notable people with this name include:

 Alirio Díaz (1923–2016), Venezuelan classical guitarist and composer 
 Alirio Palacios (1938–2015), Venezuelan visual artist
 Alirio Ugarte Pelayo (1923–1966), Venezuelan politician, journalist, diplomat and lawyer
 José Alirio Carrasco (born 1976), Colombian long-distance runner
 José Alirio Contreras (born 1978), Venezuelan professional racing cyclist

See also

References